Maneadero is a town in the Ensenada Municipality of Baja California, Mexico, located about eight kilometers south of the city of Ensenada. The town is very much agriculturally oriented, and livestock makes up a fair amount of the economy. The town was created by an agrarian reform, which granted agricultural land to the people who lived there.

References 

Ensenada Municipality
Populated places in Baja California